The 2018–19 Czech Cup, known as the MOL Cup for sponsorship reasons, was the 26th season of the annual knockout football tournament of the Czech Republic. It began with the preliminary round in July 2018 and ended with the final in May 2019. The winner of the cup will gain the right to play in the third qualifying round of the 2019–20 UEFA Europa League.

Teams

Preliminary round
92 teams competed in this round.

First round
86 teams took part in this stage of the competition.

Second round
54 teams participated in the second round; 11 First League teams (all other than those playing in European competitions) entered the competition at this stage, joining the 43 winners of the first round matches.

Third round
32 teams participated in the third round; the final five First League teams entered the competition at this stage (holders Slavia Prague, Viktoria Plzeň, Jablonec, Sigma Olomouc and Sparta Prague). They were joined by the 27 winners of the second round matches.

Fourth round
The fourth round is due to commence on 31 October 2018.

Quarter-finals

Semi-finals

Final

See also
 2018–19 Czech First League
 2018–19 Czech National Football League

References

External links
Season on soccerway.com

Czech Cup seasons
Cup
Czech